István Séllyei (8 June 1950 – 19 July 2020) was a Hungarian wrestler. He competed in the men's Greco-Roman 90 kg at the 1976 Summer Olympics.

References

External links
 
 
 
 

1950 births
2020 deaths
Hungarian male sport wrestlers
Olympic wrestlers of Hungary
Wrestlers at the 1976 Summer Olympics
Sportspeople from Eger